Odontomyia microleon is a European species of soldier fly.

Distribution
North and Central Europe, Russia, Mongolia, China, Slovakia, Ukraine, Latvia.

References

Stratiomyidae
Diptera of Europe
Diptera of Asia
Flies described in 1758
Taxa named by Carl Linnaeus